Tarakeshwara is a form of the Hindu god Shiva.

Places and people named after the god include:

 Tarakeshwar, a municipality in Kathmandu, Nepal
 Tadkeshwar, a town in Gujarat, India
 Tarakeswar, a town in West Bengal, India
 Tarakeswar (community development block)
 Tarakeswar (Vidhan Sabha constituency)
 Tarakeswar Degree College
 Tarakeswar railway station
 Taraknath Temple in Tarakeswar
 Tarakeshwara Temple, Hangal, in Karnataka, India
 Tarkeshwar Mahadev, a village in Uttarakhand, India
 Tarkeshwar Pandey, Indian politician